Dan Kutler (born May 2, 1970 in Mountain View, California) is a former butterfly swimmer, who was born in the United States, and swam for Israel in the 1996 Olympics in Atlanta.  He is Jewish and grew up in Santa Clara, California, competed for Cupertino High School, and competed for UCLA from 1988 to 1992 where he was a 7-time All American.

Kutler then moved to Israel in 1994 to begin swimming for their national team in preparation for the 1996 Olympics in Atlanta. In Atlanta, he swam the four-man 4x100 meter medley with Yoav Bruck, Eitan Urbach, and Vadim Alexeev.  The team reached the final, taking eighth place.  He retired after the Olympics.

In 1997 he was inducted into the Southern California Jewish Sports Hall of Fame.

See also
List of select Jewish swimmers

References

External links
 

1970 births
Living people
Olympic swimmers of Israel
Male butterfly swimmers
Swimmers at the 1996 Summer Olympics
Jewish American sportspeople
Jewish swimmers
People from Mountain View, California
American male swimmers
Universiade medalists in swimming
Universiade gold medalists for the United States
Universiade bronze medalists for the United States
Medalists at the 1991 Summer Universiade
21st-century American Jews